Thenavattu is a 2008 Indian Tamil-language action film written and directed by V. V. Kathir, starring Jiiva and Poonam Bajwa, with Ganja Karuppu, Ravi Kale, Shafi, Saikumar, and Rajan P. Dev in supporting roles. The music of the film was composed by Srikanth Deva. The film released on 21 November 2008 and received highly negative reviews from critics. It was a commercial failure in metros but performed well at B and C-centers.

Plot

The film starts with Kailasam, the somber bigwig who is performing the last rites of someone dear to him, but the appearance of Kottai (first in the chaotic Koovagam festival and later atop a Veeranam pipe) swinging a scythe maniacally sets the tone for the rest of the film.

Cut to the flashback a few months ago: in Ramnad, Kottai's mother is cutting down logs and boasting about her son: he is a god who deserves to see the outside world and derive its benefits. Kottai journeys to big bad Chennai in company with Vellaiyan, who dances with every Karagattam dancer on the roadside, makes lewd jokes, and appears to have only one thing on his mind. They end up at the massive home of Kailasam, the local terror who slices up people. But the heroes are unaware of this.

Kottai and Vellaiyan think that all Kailasam does is cut up trees, which is why he requires their blacksmithing skills. However, Kottai discovers that Kailasam hired him to make sickles to kill people. Kottai then goes to work by feeding crying children milk and helping men with epileptic seizures. He also falls in love with the first fair-complexioned, slim beauty he comes across, Gayatri. Naturally, Gayatri is kind-hearted, wears saris and teaches music to students. Kottai's logic for falling in love with her is that she treats him like his own family.

Meantime, there is yet another villain Santhosh, who is Kailasam's son. Santhosh proceeds to play musical instruments, mouth punchlines, and rape women. There also a remarkably stupid and one-dimensionally portrayed minister and a helpless, frustrated cop named Suryaprakash, who simply stands like a rock in uniform and wants to settle a score with Kailasam because Santhosh raped and killed his sister. Naturally, Santhosh continues to rape women, and Suryaprakash continues to stand still. Kottai goes on making aruvaals until Santhosh catches sight of the ravishing Gayatri. Santosh touches Gayathri inappropriately, and all hell breaks loose. Kottai bashes Santhosh, not knowing that he is Kailasam's son. When Kailasam learns that Kottai has beaten his son to death, he tries to take revenge on Kottai. Kottai, with the help of Suryaprakash, kills Kailasam and the minister. The film ends with Kottai returning to his home.

Cast
 Jiiva as Kottai
 Poonam Bajwa as Gayathri (voice dubbed by Renuka Kathir)
 Ganja Karuppu as Vellaiayan
 Ravi Kale as Kailasam
 Shafi as Santhosh
 P. Sai Kumar as Suryaprakash (voice dubbed by P. Ravi Shankar)
 Rajan P. Dev as Minister
 Saranya as Kottai's mother
 Delhi Ganesh as Gayatri's father
 A. Revathi as Transgender Chief
 Suja Varunee in a special appearance

Production
V. V. Kathir, a former assistant director of Seeman and Surya Prakash, narrated the script to R. B. Choudary, who liked it. The lead role was offered to actor Jiiva who agreed to do the film. A photo session was completed in Pallavaram Hills. Jeeva's elder brother Jithan Ramesh had earlier starred in producer Anthony's Puli Varudhu (2007). 

Bhavana was originally slated to play the female lead but she left the film due to unknown reasons. Poonam Bajwa (who was also shooting for Seval (2008) simultaneously) was then signed, thus making her debut in Tamil cinema. 

Saranya Ponvannan was then cast to play the mother of Jiiva's character. 

Art director Roobesh created a huge set at YMCA resembling Koothaandavar Temple. 

Thenavattu was the first Tamil film which displayed respect and dignity towards the transgender section of the society.

Soundtrack
The soundtrack was composed by Srikanth Deva in his second collaboration with Jiiva after E (2006).

Release
Thenavattu was the second film to be distributed by Sun Pictures.

Post Thenavattu, V V Kathir was set to direct Karthi's Siruthai (2011) but backed out due to unknown reasons. He has since been on a hiatus. 

Due to the film's poor response, Antony stopped producing films. 

Jeeva and Poonam however starred together in Kacheri Arambam (2010).

Critical reception
Behindwoods wrote:"Thenavattu is for people who just adore illogical masala flicks". Rediff called it "silly and ridiculous" and also added "the culprit here clearly is V V Kathir's half-baked script that manages to destroy Jiiva's credibility. This flick is all aruvaal and no brains". Indiaglitz wrote: "Director Kathir shied away from experimenting with his latest venture and took the familiar path of commercial entertainer following the footsteps of his guru".

References

2008 films
Transgender-related films
2000s Tamil-language films
Films scored by Srikanth Deva
2008 action drama films
Indian action drama films
Films about rape in India
2008 LGBT-related films